Hunter is a village in Greene County, New York, United States. The population was 429 at the 2020 census, down from 502 at the 2010 census. The village is in the northwestern part of the town of Hunter on Route 23A.

History 

The community was initially called "Edwardsville" after William Edwards, who founded the village by building a tannery there. The village was incorporated in 1896.

Geography
Hunter is located in western Greene County at  (42.208549, -74.21398), within the Catskill Mountains, in the valley of Schoharie Creek. To the west NY 23A leads down Schoharie Creek  to Prattsville.

Demographics

As of the census of 2000, there were 490 people, 238 households, and 123 families residing in the village. The population density was 303.0 people per square mile (116.8/km2). There were 639 housing units at an average density of 395.1 per square mile (152.3/km2). The racial makeup of the village was 98.37% White, 0.41% Black or African American, 0.20% Asian, 0.41% from other races, and 0.61% from two or more races. Hispanic or Latino of any race were 2.04% of the population.

There were 238 households, out of which 23.9% had children under the age of 18 living with them, 37.4% were married couples living together, 9.7% had a female householder with no husband present, and 48.3% were non-families. 44.1% of all households were made up of individuals, and 14.7% had someone living alone who was 65 years of age or older. The average household size was 2.06 and the average family size was 2.87.

In the village, the population was spread out, with 23.3% under the age of 18, 3.7% from 18 to 24, 25.1% from 25 to 44, 31.2% from 45 to 64, and 16.7% who were 65 years of age or older. The median age was 44 years. For every 100 females, there were 104.2 males. For every 100 females age 18 and over, there were 103.2 males.

The median income for a household in the village was $32,500, and the median income for a family was $48,500. Males had a median income of $35,625 versus $22,188 for females. The per capita income for the village was $20,100. About 9.4% of families and 15.5% of the population were below the poverty line, including 22.4% of those under age 18 and 10.8% of those age 65 or over.

Points of interest
Hunter Mountain is the highest peak in the county and the second highest in the Catskills. The mountain is the site of Hunter Mountain ski area which is open for skiing and tubing in the winter, and biking, sightseeing and hiking in the summer. The ski resort is the largest employer in the village, which was run by the Slutzky family, followed by Peak Resorts but is now run by Vail Resorts in the heart of Hunter. The seasonal nature of the mountain regulates the economic activity of the town.

For over 40 years, the village of Hunter has been home to Camp Loyaltown, a summer camp that specializes in caring for individuals with intellectual and other developmental disabilities, including autism, emotional and behavioral disorders, cerebral palsy and Down syndrome. Every year, more than 650 campers/guests come to Camp Loyaltown to enjoy the scenic locale and traditional summer camp activities. The camp attracts staff (counselors, admin personnel etc.) from all over the world, who become a major presence and contributor to the village's economy each summer.

References

External links
 Village of Hunter official website
 Hunter Chamber of Commerce
 Hunter Public Library
 Town of Hunter

Villages in New York (state)
Catskills
Villages in Greene County, New York